The Bruce Highway is a major highway in Queensland, Australia. Commencing in the state capital, Brisbane, it passes through areas close to the eastern coast on its way to Cairns in Far North Queensland. The route is part of the Australian National Highway and also part of Highway 1, the longest highway route in Australia. The highway is named after a popular former Queensland and federal politician, Harry Bruce. Bruce was the state Minister for Works in the mid-1930s when the highway was named after him. The highway once passed through Brisbane, but was truncated at Bald Hills when the Gateway Motorway became National Highway 1 upon its opening in December 1986.

The highway is the biggest traffic carrier in Queensland. It initially joined all the major coastal centres; however, a number of bypasses, particularly in the south, have diverted traffic around these cities to expedite traffic flow and ease urban congestion. As a result, the highway is constantly being shortened. The road is a dual carriageway from Brisbane to Kybong with some dual carriageway lengths at Gympie, many of these upgrades being completed in the 1980s (Glass House Mountains, Tanawha, Maryborough) and 1990s (Nambour, Yandina, and Cooroy).

The highway has changed its route numbering from National Highway 1 to the M1 (motorway road) or A1 (single carriageway, generally with overtaking lanes).

Major cities along the route include Gympie, Maryborough, Rockhampton, Mackay, Townsville, and Cairns. The highway passes the Glasshouse Mountains, rainforests and pastures in the Sunshine Coast, the Gunalda Range (north of Gympie), Mount Larcom (north of Gladstone), and the arid countryside north of Rockhampton; after that, it passes through land predominantly used for sugar cane, crop growing and dairy farms and the sub-tropics and tropics.

Route description

Commencing in Bald Hills at the junction of the Gateway Motorway and Gympie Arterial Road, the Bruce Highway is a motorway standard road (signed as the M1) for its first  to Kybong, where it becomes a two-lane sealed highway for most of its remainder.

Brisbane to Rockhampton

Bald Hills to Caboolture

This section of the Bruce Highway crosses the Pine River into the Moreton Bay Region, passing through mainly urban areas before crossing the Caboolture River and reaching the Caboolture / Bribie Island interchange after . It runs past or through Murrumba Downs, Griffin, Kallangur, Mango Hill, North Lakes, Dakabin, Narangba, Burpengary and Morayfield. On the way it is crossed by the Redcliffe Peninsula railway line and passes the Caboolture BP Travel Centre.

Caboolture to Caloundra

The Caboolture / Bribie Island interchange also provides access to the D'Aguilar Highway via a service road. After the D'Aguilar Highway interchange the Bruce passes through mainly rural areas and the Beerburrum and Beerwah State Forests, entering the Sunshine Coast Region before reaching the Caloundra Road interchange after a further . It passes the southern entry to Steve Irwin Way, a bypassed section of the highway, which provides access to Beerburrum, Glass House Mountains, Beerwah, Australia Zoo and Landsborough before terminating at the Caloundra Road interchange.

The Caloundra Road Interchange is also Australia's first Diverging diamond interchange.

Caloundra to Noosa

The next  to the Sunshine Motorway interchange, providing access to the Sunshine Coast, widens to 3 lanes in either direction. It then narrows back to 2 lanes. After another  the Maroochydore Road interchange provides access to Maroochydore and Woombye. The Bli Bli Road interchange, after a further , provides access to Bli Bli and Nambour. The Yandina–Coolum Road interchange, after , provides access to Yandina and Coolum. The Eumundi interchange, after , provides access to Eumundi and Noosa. The Cooroy interchange, after , provides access to Cooroy, Tewantin and Noosa.

Noosa to Gympie

The  to the end of the M1 at Kybong includes three interchanges that provide access to the Old Bruce Highway. From Kybong the highway is designated A1. It has numerous parts with lower speed limits, including urban areas, high crash zones and roadwork sites. After  from Kybong the Mary Valley Road interchange provides access to the west of the Mary River. The highway then passes through the Gympie urban fringe, with several at grade intersections providing access to various parts of the city. North of Gympie,  from the Mary Valley Road interchange, the Wide Bay Highway interchange is reached, providing access to Kilkivan.

Gympie to Maryborough

The  from the Wide Bay Highway interchange to the Maryborough–Biggenden Road interchange at Maryborough passes through Tiaro and the Gympie Road exit to Maryborough before crossing the Mary River.

Maryborough to Rockhampton

The highway maintains a speed limit of 100 occasionally slowing down to 60 or 50 while driving through several small towns including Childers, Gin Gin, Miriam Vale and Mount Larcom before reaching Rockhampton.

Development of the M1

The Bruce Highway from Kybong to Gympie remains signed as A1. Section D of the project (Woondum to Curra, including a bypass of Gympie) will, when completed in 2024, become the next stage of the M1.

While the references use Woondum as a designator for sections of the project the new intersection that marks the end of the M1 is wholly within the locality of Kybong, although bordered on two sides by Woondum.

History

Remnants of early roads to the north of Brisbane
Roads to the north of Brisbane in the early days of settlement were constrained by the need to use reliable low level crossings of rivers and creeks well upstream from the coast.

South Pine Road runs from Enoggera Road at Alderley through Everton Park to Everton Hills, crossing Kedron Brook.

Bunya Road runs from South Pine Road at Everton Hills to Eatons Crossing Road at Draper, after crossing the South Pine River at Drapers Crossing (a fordable crossing).

Old Northern Road runs from South Pine Road at Everton Park to another South Pine Road at Albany Creek. Eatons Crossing Road runs from this road (north of the South Pine River) to Draper. This South Pine Road continues north over the South Pine River via Cash's Crossing and thence to Gympie Road at Strathpine.

Old North Road links this South Pine Road at Brendale to Youngs Crossing Road at Bray Park. Youngs Crossing Road continues to Dayboro Road at Petrie after crossing the North Pine River.
Further upstream, Whiteside Road (now submerged by Lake Samsonvale) provided a fordable crossing at Quinn's Crossing when water level was too high at Youngs Crossing.

Further north, another segment of Old North Road starts at Caboolture River Road in Upper Caboolture, crosses the Caboolture River at Zillmans Crossing and proceeds to Wamuran.

Early roads from the North Pine River crossing to the Caboolture River crossing may have included parts of:
 Narangba Road from Anzac Avenue in Kallangur to Narangba, where it becomes (after a short distance as Main Street) Oakey Flat Road , to Morayfield Road at Morayfield.
 Burpengary Road from Boundary Road at Dakabin to Burpengary, where it becomes Station Road. From Station Road the direct route to Morayfield follows Obrien Road and Lindsay Road.
 Old Gympie Road from Anzac Avenue in Kallangur to Morayfield Road at Burpengary.
 Caboolture River Road from Morayfield Road at Morayfield to Old North Road at Upper Caboolture.

The Oakey Flat Road route avoids the crossing of Burpengary Creek on Obrien Road at Burpengary. From Oakey Flat Road at Morayfield a route consisting of Williamson Road, Forest Hills Drive, Haywood Road and Moorina Road runs to Caboolture River Road at Upper Caboolture, avoiding the crossing of Sheep Station Creek on Morayfield Road at Morayfield.

Early roads from Caboolture (after travelling east from Wamuran) to Landsborough and then to the Bruce Highway at Palmview may have included parts of:
 Another segment of Old Gympie Road from Caboolture to Landsborough.
 Beerburrum Road from Caboolture to Beerburrum, where it joins the Steve Irwin Way to Landsborough and Palmview.

Tom Petrie’s roads

Murrumba Homestead Grounds

The following quotations are from the Murrumba Homestead Grounds article.

 "To facilitate his timber operations Tom Petrie marked out several early northern roads, including a track between the Pine River and Bald Hills and a trail from Murrumba to Maroochydore, which later became the Gympie Road. He also blazed a track from North Pine to Humpybong (Redcliffe)."
 "In 1869 Cobb & Co opened a coach route from Brisbane to Gympie via the route Tom had helped mark out."

Anzac Avenue

Anzac Avenue is part of the history of the Bruce Highway as the highway followed it from Petrie to Rothwell for many years prior to the construction of its present alignment.

The following quotation is from the Anzac Avenue article.

 "A road from Bald Hills to Redcliffe was formed by the early 1860s, but by 1864 this was almost impassable. Tom Petrie marked a track from the Hays Inlet crossing and in the early 1870s assisted in surveying the road. Known as the "Brisbane Road" it became the primary way of accessing the Redcliffe Peninsula by road."

Upgrades
One of the most dramatic deviations of the highway was the Bald Hills to Burpengary Deviation. Beginning construction in 1972, the new route took traffic from Gympie Road at Bald Hills to Uhlmann Road at Burpengary along a much superior alignment which was also constructed to four lanes. The new route was officially opened on 10 November 1977 at a total cost of $20 million.

Due to the nature of wet weather and tropical cyclone prone areas of North Queensland, the highway is prone to frequent flooding in a number of places. Following the catastrophic Queensland floods in 2010–2011 the Australian Government commissioned a feasibility study on flood-proofing the highway.

Numerous stretches of the highway are set to undergo redevelopment, realignment, flood-proofing and extension of dual carriageway sections. Former Premier Anna Bligh announced the plans while launching the Queensland Infrastructure Plan (Now (A part of) known as Building Our Future, it includes all Transport Infrastructure Projects Nation-wide). The works are expected to total A$2 billion and include 77 projects over a period of two decades. As of December 2020, 23 major projects had been completed under the program including the delivery of 64 bridges, 30 new rest stops, 300 km safer roadsides, and 190 km wide centre line treatments.

A stretch of road between Cardwell and Tully, which is prone to frequent flooding in the wet season, is set to undergo realignment. A new route for the highway through Townsville was under construction with the first stage of the Townsville Ring Road (now called The Ring Road) already completed.

An upgrade to a stretch of the highway north of Townsville has been given approval, and will see the existing dual carriageway to the north extended by another 11 km. It will also include installation of traffic lights at Mt Low Parkway, and will be the final stage of the Ring Road link up to this section by 2015. The Queensland Main Roads Department's ultimate concept map of the development shows that the highway will progressively become Motorway standard by 2015, with the implementation of interchanges at various junctions.

The highway south of Cairns will see sections of the highway to the suburb of Edmonton become six lanes, with progressive dual-carriageway redevelopment of the highway to Gordonvale.

To improve flood immunity of the highway south of Childers, a new and improved road alignment and a higher bridge over the Isis River were completed in September 2011.

Between the Gateway Motorway and Caboolture, the highway has been widened to eight and six lanes since 2001, including the Dohles Rocks Road to Boundary Road section in October 2004, the Boundary Road to Uhlmann Road section in March 2007, and the latest section Uhlmann Road to Bribie Island Road in November 2009. Extension of the six lane section to Steve Irwin Way is proposed to commence in 2020.

A new interchange has been built at the notorious intersection of Roys Road at Beerwah. It also connects to the nearby Bells Creek Road, eliminating another dangerous intersection. This follows a similar situation at Buchanans Road in Morayfield, the intersection of which was replaced by an interchange in November 1996.

The Pumicestone Road interchange has also undergone a redesign, replacing the original low-level bridge and ramps constructed in October 1970.

The Nambour-Bli Bli Road interchange was upgraded in 1998 from a half-diamond to a dumbbell.  The old interchange had lasted just 8 years.  Later on, the entire Nambour Bypass went through a process of rehabilitation due to the extremely rough surface and dangerous pothole appearances during wet weather. This work was completed in 2009.

As of 2020 Sections A, B & C of the joint State and Federal funded  Cooroy to Curra upgrade of the highway are open. Early works for Section D has commenced. When completed, the Cooroy to Curra upgrade will bypass the town of Gympie and a predominantly two lane section will be replaced with a four lane dual-carriageway.

Major upgrades: Bald Hills to Cooroy

Major upgrades: Cooroy to Rockhampton

Major upgrades: Rockhampton to Townsville

Major upgrades: Townsville to Cairns

Projects

Northern Australian Beef Roads Upgrade
The Northern Australia Beef Roads Program announced in 2016 included the following project:

Road train access to Rockhampton (stage 2)
The project for upgrading between Gracemere saleyards and the Rockhampton abattoirs to provide access for Type 1 Road Trains was completed by early 2021 at a total cost of $30 million.
 Capricorn Highway - from Saleyards Road at Gracemere to the Bruce Highway roundabout at Rockhampton.
 Bruce Highway - from the Capricorn Highway roundabout to the Yaamba Road intersection.
 Rockhampton-Yeppoon Road - from the Bruce Highway intersection south-west to the Emu Park Road intersection (.

Highway towns

Travelling north, the following towns and small cities are found on (or very close to) the Bruce Highway.

Brisbane to Maryborough 
 Narangba
 Burpengary
 Morayfield
 Caboolture
 Elimbah
 Beerburrum
 Glass House Mountains
 Beerwah
 Landsborough
 Woombye
 Nambour
 Bli Bli
 Yandina
 North Arm
 Eumundi
 Cooroy
 Pomona
 Cooran
 Traveston
 Gympie
 Gunalda
 Bauple
 Tiaro
 Owanyilla
 Tinana

Maryborough to Rockhampton
 Aldershot
 Torbanlea
 Howard
 Horton
 Childers
 Appletree Creek
 Booyal
 Wallaville
 Gin Gin
 Miriam Vale
 Bororen
 Benaraby
 Calliope
 Mount Larcom
 Ambrose
 Raglan
 Marmor
 Bajool
 Gracemere

Rockhampton to Mackay
 The Caves
 Yaamba
 Marlborough
 Ogmore
 St Lawrence
 Clairview
 Carmila
 Ilbilbie
 Koumala
 Sarina
 Bakers Creek

Mackay to Townsville
 Glenella
 Farleigh
 Kuttabul
 Mount Ossa
 Kolijo & Calen
 Yalboroo
 Bloomsbury
 Proserpine
 Bowen & Merinda
 Guthalungra
 Gumlu
 Inkerman
 Home Hill
 Ayr
 Brandon

Townsville to Cairns
 Deeragun
 Yabulu
 Bluewater
 Rollingstone
 Mutarnee
 Bambaroo
 Toobanna
 Ingham
 Cardwell
 Tully
 Midgenoo
 El Arish
 Silkwood
 Moresby
 Mourilyan
 Innisfail
 Mirriwinni
 Babinda
 Bellenden Ker
 Deeral
 Fishery Falls
 Aloomba
 Gordonvale
 Wrights Creek
 Mount Peter
 Edmonton
 Bentley Park
 Mount Sheridan
 White Rock
 Woree

Major intersections

M1
To avoid unnecessary length this table does not show any bridges (see River crossings below)

A1
To avoid unnecessary length this table does not show any bridges (see River crossings below)

Route of former Bruce Highway through Townsville

The former Bruce Highway diverts from the A1 at the Annandale, Douglas, Mount Stuart tripoint ( from start – see Major intersections – A1) and rejoins at the Deeragun / Mount Low boundary ( from start) It runs north as University Road, crossing the Ross River via the Charles N Barton Bridge and continuing north as Nathan Street. It crosses Ross River Road (State Route 72) and Dalrymple Road, continuing north as Duckworth Street. It then turns west into Woolcock Street, crossing Louisa Creek and the Bohle River before turning north-west to rejoin the A1 after crossing Saunders Creek and Stony Creek.

River crossings
The accompanying diagram shows the crossings of all named rivers by the Bruce Highway.

Queensland Electric Super Highway
 To facilitate the use of electric vehicles the Queensland Government has installed fast chargers in convenient, safe locations close to major highways where there are existing amenities such as cafes, restaurants and shops. This network is collectively described as the Queensland Electric Super Highway. For a limited time charging electric vehicles at these stations will be free. The majority of these are along the Bruce Highway, at the locations listed below (from south to north):
 Cooroy
 Maryborough
 Gin Gin
 Childers
 Miriam Vale
 Mt Larcom
 Rockhampton
 Marlborough
 Carmila
 Mackay
 Proserpine
 Bowen
 Ayr
 Townsville
 Cardwell
 Tully
 Cairns

Other locations are:
 Hamilton
 Helensvale
 Coolangatta
 Springfield
 Gatton
 Toowoomba

Precise locations
Only three of the charging stations are on the highway. They are at Cardwell, Marlborough and Carmila (Puma Service Stations) The others are some distance from the highway in car parks or other places as listed in the reference. Note that the reference does not include the precise location of the Townsville charging station.

Distances
The greatest distance between charging stations used to be about 216 km from Townsville to Tully. Other stages greater than 150 km (which may have exceeded the range of some electric vehicles) were:
 Childers to Miriam Vale (about 155 km)
 Miriam Vale to Rockhampton (about 170 km)
 Mackay to Bowen (about 191 km)
 Bowen to Townsville (about 202 km)

Those issues have been alleviated with phase 2 of the project which added more charging stations, for example at Gin Gin, Mt Larcom, Proserpine and Ayr.

See also

 Freeways in Australia
 Freeways in Brisbane
 Freeways in Sunshine Coast
 Highways in Australia
 List of highways in Queensland

References

External links

 Australian Towns, Cities & Highways – Bruce Highway
 Bruce-Highway-Cooroy-to-Curra
 Sir Charles Newton Barton, Queensland Commissioner for Main Roads, 1960-1969

Highways in Queensland
1982 Commonwealth Games venues
Highway 1 (Australia)